Remigijus Morkevičius (10 August 1982 – 21 December 2016) was a Lithuanian mixed martial artist and kickboxer. He has fought for the Lithuanian branch of RINGS, ZST, and K-1 World MAX.

Career and biography

Morkevičius began kickboxing and Muay Thai at age of 14. He started off his career in Lithuania as a kickboxer becoming a national champion in both kickboxing and Muay Thai. He transitioned across to MMA in 2002 defeating Darius Baliulis at a local event. This win led to his being signed by Japanese promotion ZST and he would make a quick impact in Japan, knocking out his first four opponents in brutal fashion (mostly with his trademark knees) and qualifying for the 2004 ZST Grand Prix where he would suffer his first MMA defeat to Marcus Aurélio in the Semi Finals.

Morkevičius would continue to have success with the ZST promotion, bar a couple of submission defeats, culminating in his victory at the 2005 ZST Grand Prix 2 where he defeated Masahiro Oishi by knockout to win the featherweight title. Morkevičius later signed with Hero's where he would becoming increasingly re-involved in the kickboxing world with K-1 MAX.

Morkevičius' first foray into K-1 MAX began at the 2005 K-1 MAX Champions Challenge where he defeated local fighter Yasuhiro Kazuya. Morkevičius would have great initial success, winning his first four fights (including an 8-second stoppage of Shingo Garyu) and earned a shot at qualification for the 2006 K-1 MAX World Final at the 2006 K-1 MAX World Open. He faced legendary Japanese fighter Masato at this event but was unable to qualify, losing instead by technical knockout in the second round.  After this defeat his kickboxing career would go on the backburner for a while as he refocused back on MMA.

Morkevičius had mixed success with Hero's, winning 2 and losing 2 before returning to ZST in 2006. Additionally, problems outside of the ring have limited his fighting opportunities as of late. A return to K-1 MAX in 2008 has resulted in varying results, a crushing knockout defeat to Andre Dida.

Death
On December 21, 2016, Morkevičius was shot seven times with automatic rifle, near his home in Kaunas, County Šilainiai, Lithuania. His body was found on the steps of the front doors of the apartment complex where he was living. The murder occurred on Wednesday, by an unidentified man waiting for him in the car.

Titles
2005 ZST-Grand Prix 2 Featherweight champion
BUSHIDO Lithuania Muay Thai champion
BUSHIDO Lithuania Kickboxing champion

Mixed martial arts record

|-
| Win 
|align=center| 16-5
| Wataru Inatsu 
| KO (punches) 
| ZST 9 - The Battle Field 9 
|  
|align=center| 1 
|align=center| 1:15 
| Tokyo, Japan 
|
|-
| Loss 
|align=center| 15-5
| Katsuhiko Nagata 
| Decision (unanimous) 
| K-1 PREMIUM 2005 Dynamite!! 
|  
|align=center| 2 
|align=center| 5:00 
| Osaka, Japan 
|
|-
| Win 
|align=center| 15-4
| Ramazi Jakharydze 
| KO (head kick)
| Hero's Lithuania 2005 
|  
|align=center| 1 
|align=center| N/A 
| Vilnius, Lithuania 
|
|-
| Loss 
|align=center| 14-4
| Hiroyuki Takaya 
| TKO (punches) 
| Hero's 3 
|  
|align=center| 2 
|align=center| 4:16 
| Tokyo, Japan 
|
|-
| Win 
|align=center| 14-3
| Takehiro Murahama 
| KO (left hook) 
| Hero's 2 
|  
|align=center| 1 
|align=center| 1:14 
| Tokyo, Japan 
|
|-
| Win 
|align=center| 13-3
| Danny van Bergen
| Submission (armbar) 
| Shooto Lithuania - Chaosas 
|  
|align=center| 1
|align=center| N/A 
| Vilnius, Lithuania 
|
|-
| Win 
|align=center| 12-3
| Masahiro Oishi
| KO (punches) 
| ZST Grand Prix 2 - Final Round, Final 
|  
|align=center| 1 
|align=center| 3:13 
| Tokyo, Japan 
|
|-
| Win 
|align=center| 11-3
| Hirotaka Miyakawa 
| KO (knee) 
| ZST Grand Prix 2 - Final Round, Semi Finals 
|  
|align=center| 1 
|align=center| 0:48 
| Tokyo, Japan 
|
|-
| Win 
|align=center| 10-3
| Jakob Shaap 
| Submission (triangle choke) 
| Shooto Lithuania - Bushido 
|  
|align=center| 1
| 
| Vilnius, Lithuania 
|
|-
| Win 
|align=center| 9-3
| Boulem Belaini 
| KO (knee & punches) 
| ZST Grand Prix 2 - Opening Round 
|  
|align=center| 1 
|align=center| 0:05
| Tokyo, Japan 
|
|-
| Loss 
|align=center| 8-3
| Naoyuki Kotani 
| Submission (armbar) 
| ZST - Battle Hazard 1 
|  
|align=center| 1 
|align=center| 2:07 
| Tokyo, Japan 
|
|-
| Loss 
|align=center| 8-2
| Hideo Tokoro 
| Submission (triangle choke) 
| ZST 5 - The Battle Field 5 
|  
|align=center| 1 
|align=center| 3:30 
| Tokyo, Japan 
|
|-
| Win 
|align=center| 8-1
| Artemij Sitenkov 
| Submission (guillotine choke) 
| Shooto Lithuania - Vendetta 
|  
|align=center| 1 
|align=center| 1:28 
| Vilnius, Lithuania 
|
|-
| Win 
|align=center| 7-1
| Takahiro Uchiyama 
| KO (punch) 
| ZST - GT-F 
|  
|align=center| 1 
|align=center| 1:48 
| Tokyo, Japan 
|
|-
| Loss 
|align=center| 6-1
| Marcus Aurélio
| Submission (triangle choke) 
| ZST Grand Prix - Final Round, Semi Finals 
|  
|align=center| 1 
|align=center| 2:48 
| Tokyo, Japan 
|
|-
| Win 
|align=center| 6-0
| Takumi Yano 
| KO (slam) 
| ZST Grand Prix - Final Round, Quarter Finals 
|  
|align=center| 1 
|align=center| 4:36 
| Tokyo, Japan 
|
|-
| Win 
|align=center| 5-0
| Menno Dijkstra 
| KO (knee) 
| ZST Grand Prix - Opening Round 
|  
|align=center| 1 
|align=center| 0:20 
| Tokyo, Japan 
|
|-
| Win 
|align=center| 4-0
| Atsuhiro Tsuboi 
| KO (knee) 
| ZST 4 - The Battle Field 4 
|  
|align=center| 1 
|align=center| 0:41 
| Tokyo, Japan 
|
|-
| Win 
|align=center| 3-0
| Hideo Tokoro 
| KO (knees) 
| ZST 3 - The Battle Field 3 
|  
|align=center| 1 
|align=center| 2:54 
| Tokyo, Japan 
|
|-
| Win 
|align=center| 2-0
| Atsuhiro Tsuboi 
| KO (knee) 
| ZST 2 - The Battle Field 2 
|  
|align=center| 2 
|align=center| 1:37 
| Tokyo, Japan 
|
|-
| Win 
|align=center| 1-0
| Darius Balulis 
| Submission (rear-naked choke) 
| RF 2002 - Vol. 2 
|  
|align=center| 2 
|align=center| 1:37 
| Lithuania 
|

Kickboxing record

|-
|-  bgcolor="#CCFFCC"
| 2014-11-15 || Win ||align=left| Juan Martos || HERO'S World GP 2014 Lithuania || Vilnius, Lithuania || TKO (Knees) || 2 ||  || 10-2-1
|-
|-  bgcolor="#CCFFCC"
| 2011-11-19 || Win ||align=left| Eliasz Jankowski || HERO'S World GP 2011 Lithuania || Vilnius, Lithuania || KO (Spinning Heel kick & Flying Knee) || 1 || 0:29 || 9-2-1
|-
|-  bgcolor="#CCFFCC"
| 2010-04-10 || Win ||align=left| Joel Knoch || K-1 World Grand Prix 2010 in Vilnius || Vilnius, Lithuania || TKO (Punches) || 1 || 0:39 || 8-2-1
|-
|-  bgcolor="#c5d2ea"
| 2010-03-28 || Draw ||align=left| Michał Głogowski || K-1 World Grand Prix 2010 in Warsaw || Warsaw, Poland || Decision Draw || 3 || 3:00 || 7-2-1
|-
|-  bgcolor="#CCFFCC"
| 2008-11-08 || Win ||align=left| Leo Boninger || MMA Bushido HERO'S 2008 || Vilnius, Lithuania || Decision (Unanimous)  || 3 || 3:00 || 7-2
|-  bgcolor="#FFBBBB"
| 2008-07-07 || Loss ||align=left| Andre Dida || K-1 World MAX 2008 World Championship Tournament Final 8 || Tokyo, Japan || TKO (3 Knockdowns) || 1 || 1:43 || 6-2
|-
! style=background:white colspan=9 |
|-  bgcolor="#FFBBBB"
| 2006-04-05 || Loss ||align=left| Masato || K-1 World MAX 2006 World Tournament Open || Tokyo, Japan || TKO (Corner Stoppage) || 2 || 1:56 || 6-1
|-
! style=background:white colspan=9 |
|-
|-  bgcolor="#CCFFCC"
| 2006-03-10 || Win ||align=left| Denis Schneidmiller || K-1 East Europe MAX 2006 || Vilnius, Lithuania || Decision (Unanimous) || 3 || 2:00 || 6-0
|-
|-  bgcolor="#CCFFCC"
| 2006-02-04 || Win ||align=left| Shingo Garyu || K-1 World MAX 2006 Japan Tournament || Saitama, Japan || KO (Flying Knee) || 1 || 0:08 || 5-0
|-
|-  bgcolor="#CCFFCC"
| 2005-11-05 || Win ||align=left| Su Hwan Lee || K-1 Fighting Network Korea MAX 2005 || Seoul, South Korea || KO (Left hook) || 2 || 2:50 || 4-0
|-
|-  bgcolor="#CCFFCC"
| 2005-10-12 || Win ||align=left| Yasuhiro Kazuya || K-1 World MAX 2005 Champions Challenge || Tokyo, Japan || Decision (Unanimous) || 3 || 3:00 || 3-0
|-
|-  bgcolor="#CCFFCC"
| 2003-05-10 || Win ||align=left| Aurelijus Guogis || MUAY THAI super fights - "SPROGIMAS" || N/A || TKO (Doctor stoppage) || 1 || N/A || 2-0
|-
|-  bgcolor="#CCFFCC"
| 2002-12-14 || Win ||align=left| Dmitrij Vasiljev || 6th BUSHIDO-RINGS tournament "DINAMITAS" || N/A || KO (Knee) || 1 || N/A || 1-0
|-
|-
| colspan=9 | Legend:

See also
List of male kickboxers
List of male mixed martial artists

References

External links
Kickboxing record

1982 births
2016 deaths
Lithuanian male kickboxers
Welterweight kickboxers
Lithuanian male mixed martial artists
Featherweight mixed martial artists
Mixed martial artists utilizing Muay Thai
Lithuanian Muay Thai practitioners
Sportspeople from Kaunas
Deaths by firearm in Lithuania
People murdered in Lithuania
2016 crimes in Lithuania
2016 murders in Europe
2010s murders in Lithuania